James Duggan (May 22, 1825 – March 27, 1899) was an Irish-American prelate of the Roman Catholic Church. He served as the fourth bishop of the Diocese of Chicago from 1859 to 1869, officially resigning in 1880.

Biography

Early years

James Duggan was born on May 22, 1825 in Maynooth, County Kildare, Ireland, a clothier's son. At the invitation of St. Louis Archbishop Peter Kenrick, recruiting young men to fill the need for priests in the United States, he emigrated in 1842 to complete studies for the priesthood at St. Vincent's Seminary in Cape Girardeau, Missouri. He was ordained a priest on May 29, 1847.

In 1854 Archbishop Kenrick appointed Duggan vicar general of St. Louis and then, after only five years of priesthood, appointed him temporary administrator of the Diocese of Chicago after Bishop James Oliver Van de Velde, the second bishop of Chicago, was translated to Natchez in 1853.

On May 1, 1857, Kenrick consecrated Duggan titular bishop of Gabala and coadjutor bishop of St. Louis. Again he became administrator of the Diocese of Chicago when Bishop Anthony O'Regan, the third bishop of Chicago, resigned on June 25, 1858. On January 21, 1859 Bishop Duggan was appointed the fourth bishop of Chicago, aged only 34.

Bishop of Chicago
Duggan faced challenges in Chicago: the legacy of the decade-long lack of leadership in the diocese, the effects of the financial panic of 1857, and of the Civil War. German Catholics were hostile to an Irish bishop. Irish-born priests were hostile to his stand against the Fenian Brotherhood: he denied the sacraments to anyone tied to this secret society. Some clergy felt Bishop Duggan did not do enough to support the University of St. Mary of the Lake with its seminary, the first chartered university in Illinois, at a time of crisis in enrollment and its finances.

In any event, Duggan had enjoyed a reputation, confirmed by his swift ecclesiastical promotion, for intelligence, affability, and eloquence. Yet after he returned from the Second Plenary Council of Baltimore in 1866 he began to change: moodiness, erratic behavior, signs of stress. When Duggan traveled abroad to relax and recover, several of his priests concerned for the bishop's stability took the opportunity to ask the Vatican to investigate.

Removal and institutionalization
Ten years after his installation, on April 14, 1869, Bishop Duggan was removed as Chicago bishop and spent the next 29 years living in obscurity in a sanatorium conducted by the Sisters of Charity in St. Louis.  The Rev. Thomas Foley, a priest of the Archdiocese of Baltimore, was named Coadjutor bishop and served as Chicago's bishop in his place.  Duggan resigned officially as bishop on September 10, 1880 and died at the sanatorium on March 27, 1899. At a time before accurate diagnosis and treatment of mental illness was possible, Duggan was institutionalized on the understanding that he was "hopelessly insane". Today there is no evidence with which to diagnose what exactly he suffered from.

On March 29, 2001 Bishop Duggan's remains were ceremoniously moved from Calvary Cemetery in Evanston, Illinois to be placed in the Bishop's Mausoleum at Mount Carmel Cemetery in Hillside, Illinois where most of his colleague bishops of Chicago are buried. The stigma of mental illness perhaps explains why this had not happened in 1912, the year the Mausoleum was completed.

References

1825 births
1899 deaths
People from Maynooth
19th-century Roman Catholic bishops in the United States
American Roman Catholic clergy of Irish descent
Irish emigrants to the United States (before 1923)
People from Chicago
Roman Catholic bishops of Chicago
Burials at the Bishop's Mausoleum, Mount Carmel Cemetery (Hillside)